Christopher Delia (born 27 December 1971) is a Canadian equestrian. He competed in two events at the 1996 Summer Olympics.

References

External links
 

1971 births
Living people
Canadian male equestrians
Olympic equestrians of Canada
Equestrians at the 1996 Summer Olympics
Place of birth missing (living people)